is a Japanese manga artist, known for Blade of the Immortal, as well as several other short works. He has also done various illustrations for magazines and ero guro work.

Education
Samura says that he always wanted to be a manga artist. However, unlike most manga artists, he attended art school for a time and has a classical art education. He disliked oil painting and prefers to work in black and white. He says that he disliked oil painting from the start because of the smell of the paint and employed someone to help himself cheat to get through the course, which he is quite open about in interviews. He never completed the course because he got picked up by Afternoon before he graduated to do Blade of the Immortal.

Works

Manga
 (1993 – 2012; serialized in Monthly Afternoon)
 (2002; published by Afternoon KC)
 (2000; published in Afternoon Season Special Edition)
 (2000; published in Afternoon Season Special Edition)
 (2005 – 2007; serialized in Manga Erotics F)
 (2009; published by Afternoon KC)
 (2004; published in Monthly Afternoon)
 (2009; published in Monthly Afternoon)
 (2005 – 2006; serialized in QuickJapan)
 (2006; published in Monthly Afternoon)
 (2008; published in Monthly Comic Flapper)
 (2006; published in Kindai Mahjong Original)
 (2003)
 (2008 – 2011; serialized in good! Afternoon)
 (2010 – ongoing; serialized in Rakuen Le Paradis)
 (2011 – ongoing; serialized in Nemesis)
 (2013 — 2014; serialized in Manga Erotics F; 18th Japan Media Arts Festival Excellence Award)
 (July 25, 2014 — ongoing; serialized in Monthly Afternoon)

Dōjinshi

Illustrations
, an illustration series of adult themed pencil drawings (extreme violence and sexual material). The illustrations were published from 1998 to 2006. The series jumped from one publication to the next and featured in both erotic and pornographic '' such as "Tokyo H" and "Manga Erotics F", youth and art magazines such as "QuickJapan" and "Comickers", before finally being collected in an artbook.
Cover art for the Japanese version of Blood Will Tell, a video game based on Osamu Tezuka's Dororo.

References

External links
 

1970 births
Manga artists from Chiba Prefecture
Japanese graphic novelists
Living people